Kenna Partners is one of Nigeria's leading law firms with its Head Office in Lagos, and branch offices in both Abuja and Enugu. The firm is fully registered with the African Financial Corporation.

History 
Founded in 1993 as Kenna & Associates, the firm underwent a restructuring to become Kenna Partners Barristers and Associates in 2011 and fully incorporated with Corporate Affairs Commission (CAC)). In the year 2013, the firm celebrated its 20th anniversary with the presentation of a book titled ‘Law & Society’ authored by Fabian Ajogwu SAN (Principal Partner in the firm) and presented by Dr Christopher Kolade CON.

The firm's client list includes public and privately held commercial businesses and financial institutions as well as governments and state-owned entities.

Practice Areas 
The firm is structured into three main Groups – Commercial Law (corporate & investment dealings) Group, Energy & Natural Resources Practice Group, Civil Litigation and Dispute Management Group.

 Alternative Dispute Resolution & Litigation
 Banking Law, Investments & Corporate Finance
 Communications, Media and Technology
 Corporate & Commercial Law
 Criminal Law
 Energy & Natural Resources
 Environmental Law
 Intellectual Property
 Labour & Employment
 Privatization & Regulatory Law
 Non Profit & Charitable Organisations
 Trustee & Estate
 Real Estate 
 Intermodal Carriage

Publications 
The firm continue to contribute immensely to legal development practice in Nigeria through authoring of notable books that were  published by Center for Commercial Law Development (CCLD) in Nigeria. Some of which are:

 Solanke, Folake and Ajogwu, Fabian (2016), Oral & Written Advocacy: Law & Practice, Commercial Law Development Services (CLDS), Lagos, Nigeria, 302 pages
 Ajogwu, Fabian and Kenna Partners (2015), Trade & Investments in Nigeria: Legal & Regulatory Aspects, Commercial Law Development Services (CLDS), Lagos, Nigeria, 436 pages
 Ajogwu, et al, (2015), Company Secretary’s Guide on Corporate Governance, Commercial Law Development Services (CLDS), Lagos, Nigeria, 329 pages
 Ajogwu, Fabian and Oscar Nliam (2014): Petroleum Law and Sustainable Development, Eds. Center for Commercial Law Development (CCLD), Lagos, Nigeria
 Ajogwu, Fabian and Kenna & Associates (2007), Legal & Regulatory Aspects of Business (Issues in doing business in Nigeria) Eds. Center for Commercial Law Development (CCLD), Lagos, Nigeria
 Ajogwu, Fabian (2007), Corporate Governance in Nigeria: Law and Practice, Eds. Center for Commercial Law Development (CCLD), Lagos, Nigeria
 Ajogwu Fabian (2013), Law & Society Eds. Center for Commercial Law Development (CCLD), Lagos, Nigeria (Published to marked 20th Anniversary of the firm)

Notable Cases and Transactions 
The firm continue to represent Nigeria Government on some notable cases among which includes:
 BPE Opposes motion to stop power station privatization.
 Federal Government of Nigeria vs Sanusi (suspended Governor of Central Bank of Nigeria)
 ECOWAS Court Dismisses N84 Billion Suit Against the Federal Govt

References

Law firms of Nigeria
Companies based in Lagos
Nigerian companies established in 1993
Law firms established in 1993